This is a list of works by Francis Skeat (1909–2000), an English glass painter who created over 400 stained glass windows in churches and cathedrals, both in England and overseas.

References

External links
List of Stained Glass Windows created by Francis Skeat
List of Stained Glass Windows designed by Francis Skeat

Lists of stained glass works